Avriel Benjamin Kaplan (born April 17, 1989) is an American singer-songwriter. He is known for his basso profondo range and for his tenure as the vocal bass of the a cappella group Pentatonix from 2011 to 2017. As a part of the group, he released five studio albums, won three Grammy Awards, and sold over six million albums.

In June 2017, Kaplan released his solo debut EP Sage and Stone under the name Avriel & the Sequoias. The EP served as his departure from the pop-based sounds of Pentatonix to folk-oriented styles. After retiring the stage name and signing with Fantasy Records, Kaplan released his second EP I'll Get By in February 2020. His debut studio album Floating on a Dream was released in May 2022.

Early life and education
Avriel Benjamin Kaplan was born and raised in Visalia, California on April 17, 1989. He has two older siblings; brother Joshua, and sister Esther (now Koop). Koop served as the tour manager for Pentatonix from 2012 to 2019. Kaplan is of Russian and Ukrainian Jewish descent, which was the cause of repeated bullying as a child. 

Kaplan loved folk music, and frequently went to the nearby Sequoia National Park, which became an inspiration for his music. He considers his earliest musical inspirations to be Simon & Garfunkel, John Denver, Crosby, Stills, Nash & Young, and Bill Withers. Later inspirations include Iron & Wine, Bon Iver, Ben Harper, and José González.

After graduating high school, Kaplan attended Mt. San Antonio College, where he studied opera and choral studies. The college is known for its strong choral and a cappella programs.

Career

Early career (2009–2011) 
Before joining Pentatonix, Kaplan was already an accomplished a cappella artist, performing in the styles of jazz and opera among others. During his time in college, he joined the all-male a cappella group Fermata Nowhere. In 2009, the group became the first community college act to win the International Championship of Collegiate A Cappella (ICCAs). During the finals, he won the award for "Best Rhythm Section", making him the first vocal bass to receive the award. Before his victory, the award was called "Best Vocal Percussionist". In his junior year of college, he joined the vocal jazz ensemble Singcopation. In his first year as a member, the ensemble won the Monterrey Jazz Festival Competition.

Pentatonix (2011–2017) 
Kaplan joined Pentatonix in 2011, when original members Kirstin Maldonado, Mitch Grassi and Scott Hoying were searching for a bass singer and a beatboxer. The group met the day before the auditions for the third season of The Sing-Off began. The group successfully auditioned for the show and eventually went on to win the season. Kaplan acted as the group's vocal bass, but frequently sang lead parts as well.

In 2014, Kaplan co-founded A Cappella Academy, a summer camp for 12–18 year-old kids to learn about a cappella music and performance.

During the 57th Annual Grammy Awards, Pentatonix won their first Grammy Award for Best Arrangement, Instrumental or A Cappella for their Daft Punk medley. They won the award again at the 58th Annual Grammy Awards for their rendition of “Dance of the Sugar Plum Fairy”. The group won their third Grammy Award for Best Country Duo/Group Performance at the 59th Annual Grammy Awards for their cover of "Jolene", which featured Dolly Parton.

Solo projects and Floating on a Dream (2017–present) 
On April 29, 2017, Kaplan released his first solo song, "Fields and Pier", under the name Avriel & the Sequoias. His debut EP Sage and Stone was released on June 9.

On May 12, 2017, Kaplan announced that he would be leaving Pentatonix following their scheduled tour. In a video announcing his departure, he stated that although he loved being in the group, it was difficult for him to keep up with the group's demanding schedule, which required him to spend less time with his family. His final show with Pentatonix was held at the Champlain Valley Fair in Essex Junction, Vermont on September 3.

Kaplan announced his first solo tour in October 2019. He announced his second EP I'll Get By on November 5. The project, originally scheduled to be released on January 24, 2020, alongside an accompanying tour, was postponed and later released on February 28 due to Kaplan signing to Fantasy Records.

On February 15, 2022, Kaplan formally announced his debut solo studio album Floating on a Dream, which was released on May 20. The album was produced by country musician Shooter Jennings. Kaplan released the album's lead single "First Place I Go" on November 12, 2021. Its second single, "All Is Well" featuring singer Joy Williams, was released alongside the album's announcement on February 15, 2022. The full album Floating on a Dream was released on May 20, 2022. 

Kaplan and Shooter Jennings recorded the 4 episode commentary series Behind The Dream to accompany live recordings of "I'm Only Getting Started", "All Is Well", "I Can't Lie", and "When I'm A Fool" from the album Floating on a Dream at Sunset Sound Recorders.

Personal life 
Kaplan resides in Nashville, Tennessee.

Discography

Albums

Studio albums

Extended plays

Singles

As lead artist

As featured artist

Tours 

 Nashville Residency (2019)
 The Otherside Tour (2019)  
 I'll Get By Tour (2020; cancelled due to the COVID-19 pandemic)
 European Tour (2022)
 Floating on a Dream Tour (2022)

Touring members

 Daniel Ellsworth (piano, vocals)
 Jonathan Lister (drums, vocals)
 Jeremy Lister (guitar, vocals)
 Kaleb Thomas Jones (bass guitar, vocals)
 Noah Denney (drums, vocals)
 Dakota Holden (pedal steel guitar)

References

External links 

Avriel and the Sequoias

1989 births
Living people
21st-century American singers
American basses
American folk musicians
American folk-pop singers
American male guitarists
American male singer-songwriters
American people of Russian-Jewish descent
American people of Ukrainian-Jewish descent
Fantasy Records artists
Grammy Award winners
Jewish American musicians
Jews and Judaism in California
Mt. San Antonio College alumni
Pentatonix members
People from Visalia, California